Qutb-ud-Din Ahmad Shah II, born Jalal Khan, was a ruler of the Muzaffarid dynasty, who reigned over the Gujarat Sultanate from 1451 to 1458. He defeated invading Malwa forces at the battle of Kapadvanj. He tried to capture Nagor and came in conflict with Rana Kumbha of Chittor.

Reign

In 1451, after death of Muhammad Shah II, the nobles placed his son Jalál Khán on the throne with the title of Kutb-ud-dín or Qutb-ud-dín Ahmad Shah II. Sultán Mahmud Khilji of Malwa Sultanate had invaded Gujarat and had laid siege to Sultánpur. Malik Alá-ud-dín bin Sohráb Kutb-ud-dín's commander surrendered the fort, and was sent with honour to Málwa and appointed governor of Mandu. Sultán Mahmúd, marching to Sársa-Páldi, summoned Bharuch, then commanded by Sídi Marján on behalf of Gujarát Sultanate. The Sídi refused, and fearing delay, the Málwa Sultán after plundering Baroda (now Vadodara) proceeded to Nadiad, whose Bráhmans astonished him by their bravery in killing a mad elephant. Qutb-ud-dín Sháh now advancing met Sultán Mahmúd at Kapadvanj where, after a doubtful fight of some hours, he defeated Sultán Mahmúd, though during the battle that prince was able to penetrate to Kutb-ud-dín's camp and carry off his crown and jewelled girdle. The Mirăt-i-Sikandari ascribes Kutb-ud-dín's victory in great measure to the gallantry of certain inhabitants of Dholka called Darwáziyahs. Muzaffar Khán, who is said to have incited the Málwa Sultán to invade Gujarát, was captured and beheaded, and his head was hung up at the gate of Kapadvanj. On his return from Kapadvanj Kutb-ud-dín built the magnificent Hauzi Kutb or Kánkariya Tank about a mile to the south of Áhmedábád.

According to the Mirăt-i-Sikandari (Persian Text, 50–57) this war between Málwa and Gujarát was controlled by the spiritual power of certain holy teachers. The war was brought on by the prayers of Sheikh Kamál Málwi, whose shrine is in Áhmedábád behind Khudáwand Khán's mosque near Sháh-i-Álam's tomb, who favoured Málwa. Kutb-ud-dín's cause was aided by the blessing of Kutbi Álam who sent his son the famous Sháh Álam time after time to persuade Kamál to be loyal to Gujarát. At last Kamál produced a writing said to be from heaven giving the victory to Málwa. The young Sháh Álam tore this charter to shreds, and, as no evil befell him, Kamál saw that his spiritual power paled before Sháh Álam and fell back dead. Sháh Álam against his will accompanied Kutb-ud-dín some marches on his advance to Kapadvanj. Before leaving the army Sháh Álam blessed a mean camp elephant and ordered him to destroy the famous Málwa champion elephant known as the Butcher. He also, against his wish for he knew the future, at the Sultán's request bound his own sword round Kutb-ud-dín's waist. In the battle the commissariat elephant ripped the Butcher and some years later Kutb-ud-dín by accident gashed his knee with the saint's sword and died.

In the same year Sultán Mahmúd Khilji attempted to conquer Nagor then held by Fírúz Khán, a cousin of the Áhmedábád Sultán. Kutb-ud-dín Sháh despatched an army under the command of Sayad Atáulláh, and, as it drew near Sámbhar, the Málwa Sultán retired and shortly after Fírúz Khán died. Kúmbha Rána of Chittor now began interfering in the Nágor succession on behalf of Shams Khán, who had been dispossessed by his brother Mujáhid Khán, and expelled Mujáhid. But as Shams Khán refused to dismantle the fortifications of Nágor, the Chittor chief collected an army to capture Nágor, while Shams Khán repaired to Kutb-ud-dín Sháh for aid and gave that sovereign his daughter in marriage. Upon this Kutb-ud-dín sent Rái Anupchand Mánek and Malik Gadái with an army to Nágor to repulse the Rána of Chitor. In a battle near Nágor, the Gujarát troops were defeated, and the Rána after laying waste the neighbourhood of that city, returned to Chitor. In 1455–56, to avenge this raid, Kutb-ud-dín Sháh marched against Chittor. On his way the Devra Rája of Sirohi attended Kutb-ud-dín Sháh's camp, praying him to restore the fortress of Abu, part of the ancestral domain of Sirohi, which the Rána of Chittor had wrested from his house. The king ordered one of his generals, Malik Shaâbán, to take possession of Ábu and restore it to the Devra chieftain, while he himself continued to advance against Kumbhalmer. Malik Shaâbán was entangled in the defiles near Ábu, and defeated with great slaughter, and shortly after Kutb-ud-dín Sháh, making a truce with Chittor, retired to his own country. On his return the Málwa sovereign proposed that they should unite against Chittor, conquer the Rána's territories, and divide them equally between them. Kutb-ud-dín agreed and in 1456–57 marched against the Rána by way of Ábu, which fortress he captured and handed to the Devra Rája. Next, advancing upon Kumbhalmer, he plundered the country round, and then turned towards Chittor. On his way to Chittor, he was met by the Rána, and a battle was fought and win by rana , after which the Gujarat sultan fell back to his capital, where he gave himself up to licentious excess.within three months rana attacked Nágor. Kutb-ud-dín Sháh, though so overcome with drink as to be unable to sit his horse, mustered his troops and started in a palanquin. As soon as the Rána heard that the Gujarát army was in motion he retired, and the king returned to Áhmedábád. In 1458, he again led an army by way of Sirohi and Kumbhalmer against Chitor, and laid waste the country. Soon after his return, according to one account by an accidental sword wound, according to another account poisoned by his wife, Kutb-ud-dín died in May 1458 after a reign of seven years and seven days. His after-death title is Sultán-i-Gházi, the Warrior King.

Succession

On the death of Qutb-ud-dín Ahmad Sháh II, the nobles raised to the throne his uncle Dáúd, son of Ahmad Shah I. But as Dáúd appointed a carpet-spreader to high offices and committed improper acts, he was deposed after reign of seven or, according to some source twenty seven days. In 1459 his half-brother Fateh Khán, the son of Muhammad Shah II by Bíbi Mughli, a daughter of Jám Júna of Samma dynasty ruling from Thatta in Sindh; was seated on the throne at the age of little more than thirteen with the title of Mahmúd Sháh I, later popularly named Mahmud Begada.

The close connection of Fateh Khán with the saintly Sháh Álam is frequently mentioned by with Gujarát chroniclers. According to the Mirăt-i-Sikandari (Persian Text, 66–70) of his two daughters Jám Júna intended Bíbi Mughli the more beautiful for the Saint and Bíbi Mirghi the less comely for the Sultán. By bribing the Jám's envoys the king secured the prettier sister. The enraged Saint was consoled by his father who said: My son, to you will come both the cow and the calf. After Muhammad Shah II's death, fear of Kutb-ud-dín Ahmad Shah II's designs against the young Fateh Khán forced Bíbi Mughli to seek safety with her sister, and on her sister's death she married the Saint. Kutb-ud-dín made several attempts to seize Fateh Khán. But by the power of the Saint when Kutb-ud-dín attempted to seize him, Fateh Khán in body as well as in dress became a girl. According to one account Kutb-ud-dín met his death in an attempt to carry off Fateh Khán. As he rode a mad camel, the king struck at the phantom, and his sword cleaving the air gashed his knee. This was the Saint's sword, which against his will, for he knew it would be the death of the king, Qutb-ud-dín forced Sháh Álam to bind round him before the battle of Kapadvanj against Mahmud Khilji of Malwa Sultanate.

Architecture

He built Qutbuddin Mosque in Ahmedabad during his father's reign which was completed in 1446.

See also
Battle of Nagaur

References

Gujarat sultans
1458 deaths
15th-century Indian monarchs
1429 births